Mario Bliznakov (born 9 August 1982) is a Bulgarian football midfielder who plays for Greek club Eordaikos .

External links
 

1982 births
Living people
Bulgarian footballers
Association football midfielders
First Professional Football League (Bulgaria) players
PFC Pirin Gotse Delchev players
PFC Vidima-Rakovski Sevlievo players
FC Lyubimets players
PFC Marek Dupnitsa players
Bulgarian expatriate footballers
Bulgarian expatriate sportspeople in Greece
Expatriate footballers in Greece